Bimont is a commune in the Pas-de-Calais department in the Hauts-de-France region in northern France.

Geography
Bimont is a small village situated some 8 miles(13 km) northeast of Montreuil-sur-Mer, on the D152 road.

Population

See also
 Communes of the Pas-de-Calais department

References

Communes of Pas-de-Calais